Tanya Davies is an Australian politician who has served as a member of the New South Wales Legislative Assembly representing the Liberal Party since 2011. She is a member of the conservative faction of the Liberal Party.

Davies was the New South Wales Minister for Mental Health, the Minister for Women and the Minister for Ageing from January 2017 until March 2019 in the first Berejiklian government.

Early years and background
Davies was born and raised in Newcastle and moved to Sydney, aged 17, initially living with her grandparents at Regents Park for her university studies where she graduated with a degree in physiotherapy from the University of Sydney. Davies worked as a physiotherapist in the public health system before working in higher education institutions such as the University of Western Sydney and TAFE. Elected to Penrith City Council in 2008, Davies served on Council until 2012. Davies' husband, Mark Davies, also served on Penrith City Council and in 2012 was elected mayor of the City of Penrith. Tanya has two children: the eldest Laura Davies and the youngest Harry Davies.

Political career
In 2011, Davies contested the then Labor seat of Mulgoa in Sydney's western suburbs. She was elected with a swing of 23.2 per cent, winning the seat with 62 per cent of the two-party. Davies' Labor opponent was Prue Guillaume. Diane Beamer, who was the sitting Labor member, had retired from politics after holding the seat and its predecessor, Badgerys Creek, for 16 years.

In 2017, Davies was appointed the Minister for Mental Health, the Minister for Women and the Minister for Ageing in the Berejiklian government. In June 2018, Davies voted against a bill that would create  "safe access zones" outside abortion clinics. She is an opponent of legal abortion and was one of two Liberal Party members who threatened to leave the government if amendments were not made on a 2019 bill to decriminalise abortion.

Davies was re-elected at the 2019 state election, but was not reappointed to the Second Berejiklian ministry.

The 2020 redistribution undertaken for the 2023 New South Wales state election was finalised in 2021, where the district of Mulgoa was effectively renamed Badgerys Creek. Davies registered as a candidate for Badgerys Creek in that election.

Anti-vaccination actions
In January 2022 she spoke at a ‘Prayer and pushback’ forum moderated by a former Hillsong Church pastor and featuring anti-vax speakers, where, contrary to policies of state and federal government, she spoke against COVID-19 vaccinations for children.

Davies spoke again at an ‘anti-vaccination rally’ in March 2022, where among other things she criticised the Perrottet government’s handling of vaccine mandates and COVID-19 restrictions.

See also

First Berejiklian ministry

References

Liberal Party of Australia members of the Parliament of New South Wales
Living people
Members of the New South Wales Legislative Assembly
University of Sydney alumni
21st-century Australian politicians
Women members of the New South Wales Legislative Assembly
Year of birth missing (living people)
21st-century Australian women politicians